Sir John Huxtable Elliott  (23 June 1930 – 10 March 2022) was a British historian and Hispanist who was Regius Professor Emeritus at the University of Oxford and honorary fellow of Oriel College, Oxford, and Trinity College, Cambridge. He published under the name J. H. Elliott.

Biography
Born in Reading, Berkshire, on 23 June 1930, Elliott was educated at Eton College and Trinity College, Cambridge. He was an assistant lecturer at Cambridge University from 1957 to 1962 and Lecturer in History from 1962 until 1967, and was subsequently Professor of History at King's College, London, between 1968 and 1973. In 1972 he was elected to the Fellowship of the British Academy. He was elected to the American Academy of Arts and Sciences in 1977 and the American Philosophical Society in 1982. Elliott was Professor in the School of Historical Studies at the Institute for Advanced Study, Princeton, New Jersey, from 1973 to 1990, and was Regius Professor of Modern History, Oxford, between 1990 and 1997.

He held honorary doctorates from the Autonomous University of Madrid (1983), the universities of Genoa (1992), Portsmouth (1993), Barcelona (1994), Warwick (1995), Brown University (1996), Valencia (1998), Lleida (1999), Complutense University of Madrid (2003), College of William & Mary (2005), London (2007), Charles III University of Madrid (2008), Seville (2011), Alcalá (2012), and Cambridge (2013). Elliott was a Fellow of the Rothermere American Institute, University of Oxford, of whose Founding Council he was also a member.

Elliott was knighted in the 1994 New Year Honours for services to history and was decorated with Commander of Isabella the Catholic in 1987, the Grand Cross of Alfonso the Wise in 1988, the Grand Cross of Isabella the Catholic in 1996, and the Creu de Sant Jordi in 1999. An eminent Hispanist, he was given the Prince of Asturias Prize in 1996 for his contributions to the social sciences. For his outstanding contributions to the history of Spain and the Spanish Empire in the early modern period, Elliott was awarded the Balzan Prize for History, 1500–1800, in 1999. He was a corresponding member of the Real Academia de la Historia since 1965.

His studies of the Iberian Peninsula and the Spanish Empire helped the understanding of the problems confronting 16th- and 17th-century Spain, and the attempts of its leaders to avert its decline. He is considered, together with Raymond Carr and Angus Mackay, a major figure in developing Spanish historiography.

Elliott's principal publications are The Revolt of the Catalans (1963); The Old World and the New, 1492–1650 (1970); and The Count-Duke of Olivares (1986). His Richelieu and Olivares (1987) won the Leo Gershoy Award of the American Historical Association and, in 1992, the Prize XVIIe. In 2006, his book Empires of the Atlantic World: Britain and Spain in America 1492–1830 was published by Yale University Press, winning the Francis Parkman Prize the following year. In 2012, he published his reflections on the progress of historical scholarship in History in the Making.

Elliott was hospitalised due to pneumonia and kidney complications, at the John Radcliffe Hospital in Oxford, on 5 March 2022. He died on 10 March, at the age of 91.

Works 
 The Revolt of the Catalans: A Study in the Decline of Spain, 1598–1640 (Cambridge University Press, 1963; pbk reprint, 1984). 
 Imperial Spain: 1469–1716 (London 1963, revised repr. Penguin Books, 2002). 
 Europe Divided, 1559–1598 (London 1963; 2nd ed. 2000). 
 The Old World and The New 1492–1650 (Cambridge University Press, 1970; pbk reprint, 2008). 
 Memoriales y cartas del Conde-Duque de Olivares, 2 vols. (with José F. de la Peña) (Madrid 1978–80). 
 Richelieu and Olivares (Cambridge University Press, 1984; pbk reprint, 2003). 
 The Count-Duke Olivares: The Statesman in an Age of Decline (Yale University Press 1986, revised repr. 1989). 
 Spain and Its World, 1500–1700: Selected Essays (Yale University Press, 1989; pbk reprint, 1990). 
 The World of the Favourite (edited, with L. W. B. Brockliss) (Yale University Press, 1999).  
 The Sale of the Century: Artistic Relations between Spain and Great Britain, 1604–1655 (with Jonathan Brown) (Yale University Press 2002). 
 A Palace for a King, with Jonathan Brown (Yale University Press, 2003). 
 Empires of the Atlantic World: Britain and Spain, 1492–1830 (Yale University Press, 2006). 
 Spain, Europe and the Wider World, 1500–1800 (Yale University Press, 2009). 
 History in the Making (Yale University Press, 2012). 
 Scots and Catalans: Union and Disunion (Yale University Press, 2018; pbk reprint, 2020).

References

External links 
 National Portrait Gallery painting "Historians of 'Past and Present'" by Stephen Frederick Godfrey Farthing
 "The Passionate Historian – A Conversation with John H. Elliott", Ideas Roadshow, 2013

1930 births
2022 deaths
People from Reading, Berkshire
People educated at Eton College
Alumni of Trinity College, Cambridge
Fellows of Trinity College, Cambridge
Fellows of King's College London
English historians
Fellows of Oriel College, Oxford
Fellows of the British Academy
Historians of Spain
Institute for Advanced Study faculty
British Hispanists
Historians of Latin America
Latin Americanists
Members of the University of Cambridge faculty of history
Knights Bachelor
Recipients of the Civil Order of Alfonso X, the Wise
Knights Grand Cross of the Order of Isabella the Catholic
Regius Professors of History (University of Oxford)
Corresponding members of the Real Academia de la Historia
Deaths from pneumonia in England
Members of the American Philosophical Society